Teams made up of athletes representing different National Olympic Committees (NOCs), called mixed-NOCs teams, participated in the 2020 Winter Youth Olympics. These teams participated in either events composed entirely of mixed-NOCs teams, or in events which saw the participation of mixed-NOCs teams and non-mixed-NOCs teams. When a mixed-NOCs team won a medal, the Olympic flag was raised rather than a national flag; if a mixed-NOCs team won gold, the Olympic anthem would be played instead of national anthems. A total of 6 events with Mixed NOCs were held.

Background 
The concept of mixed-NOCs was introduced in the 2010 Summer Youth Olympics, in which athletes from different nations would compete in the same team, often representing their continent. This is in contrast to the Mixed team (IOC code: ZZX) found at early senior Olympic Games.

Medal summary

Medal table
</onlyinclude>

Medalists

Teams

Curling

The Mixed curling doubles tournament is one of six mixed-NOCs events. There are 48 teams participating in this event. Teams have one boy and one girl thrower. The teams will be selected by the organizing committee based on the final ranking from the mixed team competition in a way that balances out the teams. The players in each pair will then be allowed time to train together.

Figure skating

The Figure skating team trophy tournament is one of six mixed-NOCs events. There are 8 teams participating in this event. Teams have one boy and one girl singles, one pairs and one ice dancing skaters. The skaters who took part the team trophy was determined by draw.

Freestyle skiing and Snowboarding

The team ski-snowboard cross tournament is the event where there were also teams representing individual NOCs. There are 12 mixed-NOCs teams of total 19 teams participating in this event. Teams have one boy and one girl ski snowboarders and one boy and one girl ski skiers.

Ice hockey

Boys' tournament

The boys' 3x3 mixed team tournament is one of six mixed-NOCs events. There are 8 teams participating in this event. Teams have eleven players and two goaltenders. The players who took part the mixed team tournament were determined by draw.

Girls' tournament

The girls' 3x3 mixed team tournament is one of six mixed-NOCs events. There are 8 teams participating in this event. Teams have eleven players and two goaltenders. The players who took part the mixed team tournament were determined by draw.

Luge

The luge team relay tournament is the event where there were also teams representing individual NOCs. There are 4 mixed-NOCs teams of total 13 teams participating in this event. Teams have one boy and girl singles, and mixed doubles lugers.

Short track speed skating

The mixed NOC short track speed skating team relay tournament  is one of six mixed-NOCs events. There are 8 teams participating in this event. Teams have two boy and girl short track speed skaters. The players who took part the mixed team relay tournament were determined by draw.

Ski mountaineering

The ski mountaineering mixed relay tournament is the event where there were also teams representing individual NOCs. There are 3 mixed-NOCs teams of total 11 teams participating in this event. Teams have two boy and two girl ski mountaineers.

Speed skating

The mixed NOC speed skating team sprint tournament  is one of six mixed-NOCs events. There are 16 teams participating in this event. Teams have two boy and girl speed skaters. The players who took part the mixed team relay tournament were determined by draw.

References

Nations at the 2020 Winter Youth Olympics
Mixed teams at the Youth Olympics